A Star Fell from Heaven may refer to:

 A Star Fell from Heaven (1934 film), an Austrian film
 A Star Fell from Heaven (1936 film), a British film